Johnnie To Kei-fung (born 22 April 1955) is a Hong Kong film director, screenwriter and film producer. Popular in his native Hong Kong, To has also found acclaim overseas. Intensely prolific, To has made films in a variety of genres, though in the West he is best known for his action and crime movies, which have earned him critical respect and a cult following, which includes American filmmaker Quentin Tarantino.

To's biggest international successes include Breaking News, Election, Election 2 (a.k.a. Triad Election), Exiled, Mad Detective and Drug War; these films have appeared in a number of international film festivals, been distributed theatrically in France and the United States, and been widely sold to foreign countries.

His films, often made in collaboration with the same group of actors, screenwriters and cinematographers, frequently explore themes of friendship, fate and the changing face of Hong Kong society. Sometimes described as "multifaceted and chameleonic" due to his ability to switch tones and genres between movies, To is nonetheless seen as having a consistent style, which involves mixing subdued realism and social observation with highly stylised visual and acting elements. To has cited King Hu as the director who has influenced his work the most.

To heads the Hong Kong-based production company Milkyway Image with his frequent co-director Wai Ka-Fai.

Career
To began his career at age 17 as a messenger for the Hong Kong television studio TVB. From there To moved up the ladder, working as an executive producer and director for TV shows starting in 1973. In 1978, he shot his first theatrical feature, but continued working in television. In 1983, he directed and screen-wrote the critically acclaimed The Legend of the Condor Heroes, a dramatised TV series base on the martial art novel of the same name by Louis Cha.

While working as an assistant TV director during the Shaw Studios era he directed All About Ah-Long (1989), starring Chow Yun-fat. The film became one of the biggest box office hits in that year. In 1988, he co-directed The Big Heat, his first action movie. The film was produced by Tsui Hark. The end of the 1980s also saw some of To's biggest commercial successes, the vast majority of which were comedies. His 1988 film The Eighth Happiness was that year's highest-grossing movie.

In 1996, To and frequent collaborator Wai Ka-Fai formed Milkyway Image, a production house specialising in cost-efficient independent films made by To and Wai, as well their frequent collaborators from Law Wing-Cheong to scriptwriter Yau Nai-Hoi.

In April 2011, it was announced that he would be a member of the jury for the main competition at the 2011 Cannes Film Festival.

His film Life Without Principle (2011) was selected as the Hong Kong entry for the Best Foreign Language Film Oscar at the 85th Academy Awards, but it did not make the final shortlist.

To is a member of the governing Council of the Hong Kong Arts Development Council.

It was announced in February 2023 that To would be a jury member for the 73rd Berlin International Film Festival.

Festivals and awards

Commercially successful in his native Hong Kong, To's films have regularly appeared at international festivals, most notably in Europe and North America. Six of To's films have been featured at the Cannes Film Festival: Breaking News premiered as an Out-of-Competition midnight screening in 2004; Election was shown in Competition in 2005; its sequel, Election 2 (a.k.a. Triad Election) was screened in Out-of-Competition midnight screenings in 2006, and Triangle was screened in Out-of-Competition midnight screenings in 2007; Vengeance competed for the prestigious Palme D'Or in 2009; Blind Detective was screened in Out-of-Competition midnight screenings in 2013.

At the Berlin International Film Festival, Sparrow was shown in Competition in 2008.

At the Venice International Film Festival, Throw Down was screened Out-of-Competition in 2004; Exiled was shown in Competition at the festival in 2006; Mad Detective was shown in Competition in 2007; Life Without Principle was shown in Competition in 2011.

In North America, To's films have been consistently screened at the Toronto International Film Festival. The Mission, Fulltime Killer, PTU, Breaking News, Throw Down and Mad Detective all screened between 1999 and 2007. In 2006, Election, Election 2, and Exiled were screened.

In 2005, To received the "Time Machine Career Achievement Award" at the Festival de Cine de Sitges, Europe's most prestigious film festival specializing in genre films. To was also honoured as a "Filmmaker in Focus" of 2007 International Film Festival Rotterdam. In 2009, while Vengeance competed at Cannes, To was made an officer of the French Order of Arts and Letters by the French Minister of Culture in recognition for his films.

The annual Hong Kong International Film Festival held its 45th edition in April 2021. To directed the a segment of the 2020 anthology film Septet: The Story of Hong Kong. The other filmmakers who directed segments in the anthology are Sammo Hung, Ann Hui, Patrick Tam, Tsui Hark, Yuen Woo-ping and Ringo Lam. The short files were shot entirely on 35mm film with each of them touches on a nostalgic and moving story set across different time periods, with every one acting as an ode to the city.

Filmography

Monographs

 
The Rise Of Johnnie To – Marie Jost

References

External links

Johnnie To at LoveHKFilm.com
Interview with Johnnie To at IFC.com

1955 births
Living people
Hong Kong film directors
Hong Kong film producers
Officiers of the Ordre des Arts et des Lettres